Chandani Dam, is an earthfill dam on Chandani river near Paranda, Osmanabad district in the state of Maharashtra in India.it is about 68 km from district headquarter Osmanabad and 10 km from tahsil Paranda. nearby railway station is Kurduwadi Junction about 32 km via paranda.

Specifications

Purpose
 Irrigation

See also
 Dams in Maharashtra
 List of reservoirs and dams in India

References

Dams in Osmanabad district
Dams completed in 1965
1965 establishments in Maharashtra